Elisabeth Howen (12 July 1834 – 26 February 1923) was an Estonian pedagogue. She is regarded as a notable pioneer within female educational history in Estonia. 

She was born in Tallinn. She was educated at Maydellsche Schule in Tallinn, and worked as a governess before she became active at the School of Auguste Kuschky in Reval in 1875.

References

1834 births
1923 deaths
19th-century Estonian people
Baltic-German people
Women's rights activists
Estonian feminists